Charlie Chan at Monte Carlo is a 1937 American movie directed by Eugene Forde. The main character is Charlie Chan, a Chinese-Hawaiian detective. This was the sixteenth and final Charlie Chan film with Warner Oland portraying Chan. The film features Keye Luke as Charlie's son Lee and character actor Harold Huber as a French police inspector.

Warner Oland contracted bronchial pneumonia during his visit to Sweden and died there on August 6, 1938, at age 57. The series continued at Fox for another eleven entries with Sidney Toler. In 1942 Fox sold it to Monogram Pictures, and it continued on even after Toler's death in 1947 with Roland Winters in the role through six films into 1949.

Plot summary
Although Charlie and Lee are in Monaco for an art exhibit, they become caught up in a feud between rival financiers which involves the Chans in a web of blackmail and murder.
The messenger for millionaire Victor Karnoff is ambushed and murdered, and $200,000.00 worth of bonds are missing. The taxicab of 
the two Chans passes  the crime scene, and they become involved, with the blessing of the local law Chief Joubert(Huber).

Later on, a bartender who was apparently attempting to blackmail the killer is also murdered, and the bonds found in his room.
But Chan notices  that in order to make certain the bonds were discovered, their briefcase had been opened with a special key that very
few people had access to, and the bartender was not one of them.

Back at the Karnoff mansion, Chan exposes the killer, who had been embezzling in order to keep femme' fate Evelyn Grey(Field) in the
style to which she had become accustomed.

Cast 
 Warner Oland as Charlie Chan
 Keye Luke as Lee Chan
 Virginia Field as Evelyn Grey
 Sidney Blackmer as Victor Karnoff
 Harold Huber as Chief of Police Jules Etienne Joubert
 Kay Linaker as Joan Karnoff
 Robert Kent as Gordon Chase
 Edward Raquello as Paul Savarin
 George Lynn as Al Rogers
 John Bleifer as Ludwig
 Eugene Borden as Hotel Clerk (uncredited) 
 Leo White as French Butler (uncredited)

References

External links
 
 
 
 
 

1930s crime films
American black-and-white films
American crime films
Charlie Chan films
1930s English-language films
Films set in Monaco
Films directed by Eugene Forde
20th Century Fox films
Films scored by Samuel Kaylin
1930s American films